Vattappalli Matom is located in Suchindram, Kanyakumari District, Tamil Nadu, India. Suchindram is one of the famous Shivaite and Vaishnavite temple places of the erstwhile Hindu kingdom of Travancore. It is about 7km from Nagercoil, and  about 75km from Thiruvananthapuram, Kerala.  It is one of the oldest houses in Suchindram village and the family is the chief priests of the Suchindram Thanumalayan Temple. The river Pazhayaar flows nearby and the temple pond Theppakulam is in very close proximity to the house.

See also
 Suchindram
 Vaikkath Pachu Moothathu

External links
Vaikkath Pachu Moothathu — Ayurveda Practitioners of Kerala
Art and Culture
Kerala History
Traditional Medicine
Sivadwijasevasamithi
Sivadwija

References
 C.K. Moothathu "Vaikkathu Pachu Moothathu" (1996)orig: (arch:)
 Gundert, Herman (ed.) Keralolpathi (The Origin of Malabar) (Mangalore, 1868)
 Sastri, Mananthala Neelakanta, Adi Keralam (Kozhikode, 1108 ME)
 Sivadwija Kaneshumari 2012(Published) by Sivadwija Seva Samithi, Ernakulam, 2012)
 The Census Report of the Kerala Siva Brahmins (published by Sivadwija Samajam,Ernakulam, 1928)
 Varma, A.R. Rajaraja, Kerala Panineeyam (Trivandrum, 1917)

Buildings and structures in Kanyakumari district
Houses in India